Andorran nationality law is based primarily on the principle of jus sanguinis.

Eligibility for Andorran citizenship

By descent

Children born to recognised parents who were Andorran citizens at the time of birth (regardless of the place of birth) are eligible for Andorran citizenship.

By birth

Children born in Andorra under any one of the following conditions are eligible for Andorran citizenship:

 born to parents of whom either one (or both) was born in Andorra and was living permanently and principally in Andorra at the time of birth
 born to non-Andorran parents who were living permanently and principally in Andorra for at least 10 years at the time of birth

By naturalisation

Those seeking to become Andorran citizens via naturalisation are required to fulfill the following criteria:

 they must renounce existing foreign citizenships
 they must have resided in Andorra permanently for at least ten years if the applicant has spent all of his mandatory education in Andorra or for at least 20 years if he/she can prove his/her integration into Andorran society

Loss of citizenship

If an Andorran citizen serves in the armed forces or government of another country or takes up a foreign citizenship, he/she automatically forfeits his/her Andorran citizenship.

Former Andorran citizens may restore their former citizenship if their request to the government is successful.

Any Andorran may live in France without requesting a visa.

Dual nationality

Dual nationality is strictly forbidden by Andorran law. On the other hand, Spanish law recognizes dual nationality with Andorra.

See also
Andorran passport

References

External links
 Information page about Andorran nationality from the Andorran Embassy in Paris

Law of Andorra
Nationality law